The Bogotá Women's Race is a road running event exclusively for women held in Bogotá, Colombia, each year. It was established in 2007, when 6,000 women took part, and participation has risen to 17,000 in the 2013 event.

The event takes place in the Simón Bolívar Park, with most of the races using a 4 km loop. The elite athletes run three laps of the course, while the open race, for runners over 18, comprises two laps. There are a variety of classes who run just one lap: women aged between 40 and 49, those over the age of 50, girls between 12 and 14, and girls between 15 and 17. According to the organisers, the races promote "a better quality of life for women with an emphasis on physical activity as the starting point."

In 2009, the race was extended to the current , and was once again won by Fernández. The following year, another Colombian runner, Yolanda Caballero, won the race, but since 2011, the race has been won by African athletes. Ethiopian Belainesh Gebre won in 2011, setting a course record of 40:46, while two Kenyan runners won in 2012 and 2013, Veronica Nyaruai followed by Sylvia Kibet. The IAAF describe the altitude of the race, as being "energy-draining", an assessment backed up by the 2013 winner Kibet.

Results

References

Athletics in Colombia
Sport in Bogotá
Women's athletics competitions
Road running competitions